Joey Hunt (born February 22, 1994) is an American football center for the Seattle Seahawks of the National Football League (NFL). He was drafted by the Seahawks in the sixth round of the 2016 NFL Draft. He played college football at Texas Christian University.

Early years
Joey Hunt was born to Tommy and Pam Hunt. Hunt attended El Campo High School in El Campo, Texas where he graduated in 2012. His siblings are David Hunt, Cole Hunt, and Christine Hunt.

College career
Hunt committed to the TCU on January 29, 2011. Hunt played all four years on the offensive line with the Horned Frogs, playing in 42 games over that span.

Professional career

Seattle Seahawks
Hunt was selected by the Seattle Seahawks with the 215th overall pick in the sixth round of the 2016 NFL Draft. On May 6, 2016, the Seahawks announced that they had signed Hunt to his rookie contract.

On September 2, 2017, Hunt was waived by the Seahawks and was signed to the practice squad the next day. He was promoted to the active roster on December 5, 2017.

Hunt re-signed with the Seahawks on April 23, 2020. He was released on July 26, 2020.

Indianapolis Colts
Hunt had tryouts with the Cleveland Browns on August 15, with the Detroit Lions on August 16, 2020, and with the Indianapolis Colts on August 20, 2020. He signed with the Colts on August 23, 2020. He was released on September 5, 2020, and signed to the practice squad the next day. He was elevated to the active roster on November 21, November 28, December 5, December 12, and December 19 for the team's weeks 11, 12, 13, 14, and 15 games against the Green Bay Packers, Tennessee Titans, Houston Texans, Las Vegas Raiders, and Texans, and reverted to the practice squad after each game. He was placed on the practice squad/COVID-19 list by the team on December 23, 2020, and restored to the practice squad and subsequently promoted to the active roster on January 1, 2021.

Hunt re-signed with the Colts on March 29, 2021. He was released on August 31, 2021 and re-signed to the practice squad the next day. He was released on October 14. He was re-signed to the active roster on December 28, but waived four days later.

Seattle Seahawks (second stint)
On October 5, 2022, Hunt was signed to the Seahawks' practice squad. On January 17, 2023, Hunt was signed to a reserve/future contract.

References

External links
Seattle Seahawks bio
TCU Horned Frogs bio

Living people
1994 births
Players of American football from Texas
People from El Campo, Texas
American football centers
TCU Horned Frogs football players
Seattle Seahawks players
Indianapolis Colts players